Thokchom Navakumar Singh is an Indian politician. He is a former Member of the Manipur Legislative Assembly from the Khundrakpam Assembly constituency. He won as a candidate of Nationalist Congress Party. He had contested the same seat in 2002 as an Indian National Congress candidate, then finishing in fifth place. His son Thokchom Lokeshwar Singh had preceded and succeeded him in his constituency and his son was the Speaker of the Manipur Legislative Assembly from 2012 to 2017.

References

Nationalist Congress Party politicians from Manipur
Manipur MLAs 2007–2012
Living people
Year of birth missing (living people)
Manipur politicians